Nicotelline is an alkaloid first identified in 1914 as a chemical constituent of tobacco plants (Nicotiana tabacum).

The chemical structure of nicotelline wasn't elucidated until 1956, when it was determined that nicotelline is a terpyridine consisting of three linked pyridine rings.  This structure was confirmed by laboratory synthesis.  Nicotelline has the molecular formula .  It is a crystalline solid with a melting point of 147-148 °C.  It is soluble in hot water, chloroform, ethanol, and benzene.

Nicotelline has long been known to be a constituent of tobacco smoke.  As such, it has recently been proposed as a biomarker or environmental tracer for particulate matter derived from tobacco smoke.

References

Alkaloids
Pyridines